Abortion in the Dominican Republic is completely illegal. The Dominican Republic is one of the few countries of the world to have a complete ban on abortion with no exceptions.

Abortion was banned in all circumstances in 1884. Abortion has been constitutionally prohibited since September 18, 2009, when a constitutional amendment declaring the right to life as "inviolable from conception until death" was approved in Congress by a majority vote of 128 to 34. Until October 2012, women could come forward for treatment without fear of being arrested. Dr. Milton Cordero has been working since 1980 in the Republic's public hospitals, treating women who have abortions; he estimates that there are 90,000 illegal abortions per year. These illegal abortions are self-induced or done by a back-alley practitioner. Since the law was passed, abortion has risen to the third leading cause of maternal death in the country.

Abortion methods in the Dominican Republic
A common abortion method is to take over-the-counter pills that cause powerful uterine contractions, leading to the expulsion of the fetus. Drugs used include oxytocins, prostaglandins, or ergot alkaloids.  Women take the pills without knowing the proper dosage, and an overdose can cause serious hemorrhaging. Poor women suffering from hemorrhages go to inexpensive and low-quality clinics. The uterus may be incompletely cleaned out, leading to infection, or even perforated, causing internal bleeding. If a woman survives such complications, she may have reproductive problems in the future. Researchers have found that 95-97% of the abortions are unsafe, meaning done by people lacking needed skills or in places that do not meet minimal medical standards. (See Unsafe abortion.)

Women who appear at hospitals for post-abortion treatment cannot name their practitioner, who would be arrested if caught.

A new program to add incentive for using contraceptives is designed to give students an idea of the workload involved in caring for a newborn baby. Called "Bebé, Piénsalo Bien", the program was sponsored by The Dominican Republic's First Lady, Margarita Cedeño de Fernández. In May 2006 as a pilot program was launched at one school in Santo Domingo. The project lends electronic babies to students for a weekend. The program also urges parents to talk about pregnancy and child-rearing with their children.

Law
The proposal was adopted as Article 37 of the Dominican Constitution: "The right to life is inviolable from the moment of conception and until death."

Support
The initiative was backed by Roman Catholic activists and introduced by President Leonel Fernández as Proposal 21.

Opposition

The Dominican Gynecology and Obstetrics Society warned that the number of maternal deaths will increase considerably, because pregnancies can not be interrupted. The society's president, Aldrian Almonte, said the current figure of 160 deaths for each 100,000 live births per year will increase, because doctors would be reluctant to proceed from fear of being charged in cases where they must decide on the interruption of a pregnancy to preserve the mother's life. Dr. Altamonte asked, "I would like of the honorable legislators to tell me what are we going to do before the presence of a woman with severe preeclampsia or eclampsia, convulsing in any emergency room around the country, what must we do, see her die to protect ourselves from the repercussions that Article 30 stipulates?".

Protest marches were held by the National Resistance to Constitutional Backwardness and the Women's Forum for Constitutional Reform. Feminist Denise Paiewonsky asked Congress to amend the article before adopting it; otherwise it would limit women's options for reproductive health. If not one fertilized egg could be discarded, the amendment would outlaw both in vitro fertilization and forms of contraception such as the intrauterine device (IUD) and the day-after pill.

Miguel Ceara Hatton, coordinator of the United Nations Program for Human Development, criticized the approved article and the Catholic Church, which in his view has become a motor for "social exclusion" in the country. He said, "Dogma is placed ahead of the needs of the population, health, housing, and better living conditions." He pointed out that the new Constitution excludes the women's right to life.

The initiative was lobbied against by Amnesty International, which argued that the new measure "could severely limit the availability of safe abortions, even in cases when a woman is suffering from life-threatening complications or is in need of life-saving treatment incompatible with pregnancy – such as that for malaria, cancer or HIV/AIDS."

Rosario Lopez, president of the Association of Housewives Committees regretted aloud that the Assembly members approved the article without including the some exceptions to protect women and doctors. She pointed out that the article had been adopted without giving Dominicans time to consider the opinion of a team of professionals on the subject.

Objections were also made by feminist organizations, institutions, and others who favour legalizing abortion in cases of incest, rape or danger to a woman's life.

Further criminalization
Up until October 2012, women who had abortions could seek medical care without fear of arrest or interrogation.

In October 2012, the Dominican Republic debated Article 90 of the Penal Code, which prescribes criminal penalties for women who seek an abortion and for those who provide it or help provide it. Amnesty International appealed to Parliament to consider decriminalizing abortion, with the following statement: The proposed penal code flies in the face of women's and girls' human rights and maintains a situation in which health professionals are prevented from providing the best care for their patients, The criminalization of abortion in all circumstances, as maintained in the new legislation, violates women's rights to life, health and not to suffer torture or ill treatment and discrimination and it goes against international human rights commitments made by the Dominican Republic. The appeal pointed out that unsafe abortion and fear of prosecution contribute to the high rate of maternal mortality that the World Health Organization reports in the country.

Nevertheless, the Chamber of Deputies approved prison terms for inducing or helping with an abortion. "Abortion will also be punished with from 2 to 3 years and includes women who induce or a person who helps. If a doctor, nurse, midwife, surgeon, pharmacist or other professional helps induce an abortion, the penalty would be from  4 to 10 years."

Economics of abortion
As there is no legal source for abortions, abortion practitioners ask for as much as they think a woman can pay. Women who are better off can pay more and go to a cleaner clinic with a more experienced operator, and run a smaller risk of injury or death. Women who are poor go to a worse clinic with an inexperienced operator. The doctors make an individual agreement with each woman. They may demand that a woman sign a contract freeing the doctor from all responsibility or liability, before they will go ahead with the operation. However, since both parties are criminals in the eyes of the law, numbers of abortions and details about the trade are hard to confirm.

"Esperancita"
In July 2012, the Dominican Republic's harsh anti-abortion laws came under fire when a 16-year-old girl known as "Esperancita" was suffering from acute leukemia and was being denied treatment for her cancer because her chemotherapy might harm or kill the fetus. Doctors reportedly feared that they would be prosecuted or lose their right to practice medicine if they treated her. It took 10 weeks of debate before lawmakers decided that it would not be illegal for Esperancita to receive treatment to save her life. Dr. Antonio Cabrera reported that Esperancita had died on August 17, 2012, shortly after suffering a miscarriage followed by cardiac arrest. She was 13 weeks pregnant at the time of her miscarriage.

See also
Abortion and religion
Abortion law
Abortion in El Salvador
Abortion in Malta
Abortion in Nicaragua

References

Dominican Republic
Dominican Republic
Health in the Dominican Republic
Crime in the Dominican Republic
Law of the Dominican Republic
Women's rights in the Dominican Republic
Society of the Dominican Republic